Alona may refer to:

 Alona, Cyprus, a village in the Nicosia District
 Alona, Greece, a village in Florina regional unit
 Alona or Alone, another name for Alavana, the Roman settlement at Watercrook
 Alona (crustacean), a large genus of Cladocera
 Alona (plant), a genus in the plant family Solanaceae
 Alona (given name), a given name (including a list of people with the name)
 Alona Beach, a beach resort area of Panglao, Bohol, Philippines
 Alona Regional Council, a regional council in northern Israel
 15230 Alona, a main belt asteroid discovered on September 13, 1987

See also
 Alauna (disambiguation)